Big Bottom may refer to:

 the Big Bottom massacre of the Northwest Indian War
 "Big Bottom," a song by Spinal Tap from the soundtrack This Is Spinal Tap (album)
 Big Bottom, South Dakota, a ghost town in Meade County